Peter Williams (15 January 1723 – 8 August 1796) was a prominent leader of Welsh Methodism in the eighteenth century, best known for publishing Welsh-language bibles and bible commentary.

Personal life 
Williams was born on 15 January 1723 at West Marsh Farm in Laugharne in Carmarthenshire, the son of Owen and Elizabeth Williams. While a student at Carmarthen Grammar School in 1743, he was converted to Methodism after hearing a sermon by George Whitefield. For a short time, he was the schoolmaster at Cynwyl Elfed. He was ordained a deacon in 1745. In 1748, he married Mary Jenkins. He had two children Eliezer Williams (1754-1820) and Peter Bailey Williams (1763-1836).

Career 
He was refused ordination as a priest due to his Methodist beliefs and became associated with Water Street Chapel Carmarthen. He joined the Methodists in 1747 and began to tour the country preaching. He began to publish copies of Welsh language bibles at an affordable price. The first edition was published and sold out in 1770 and there was a demand for many more editions. In due course Williams produced thousands of copies of Welsh language bibles which remained popular for several generations.  His was the first translation in 1771, of 'Guide me, O Thou Great Jehovah' from the original Welsh version.

Williams produced commentaries on biblical chapters. However, his commentary on John 1 led to suggestions that he sympathized with Sabellianism. In 1791, the matter came to a head at a Methodist Association at Llandeilo and Williams was expelled.

Death 
His last years were spent in conflict with the Methodists. At this time Williams denied them use of the chapel in Water Street. Williams died at Llandyfaelog on 8 August 1796.

Careers of his sons 

Eliezer Williams and Peter Bailey Williams were educated at Carmarthen grammar school and Jesus College, Oxford. Both became clergymen in the Established Church.

Eliezer Williams was Vicar of Lampeter (1805 to 1820).

Peter Bailey Williams was Rector of Llanberis and Llanrug (1792-1836). In 1798 he led the first recorded rock climb in Britain.

References

Sources

Calvinistic Methodists
1723 births
1796 deaths
People from Laugharne